"A Star Is Burns" is the eighteenth episode of the sixth season of the American animated television series The Simpsons. It first aired on the Fox network in the United States on March 5, 1995. In the episode, Springfield decides to hold a film festival, and famed critic Jay Sherman is invited to be a judge.

The story involves a crossover with the animated series The Critic. Jay Sherman was the main character on the show. The Critic was created by Al Jean and Mike Reiss, who had previously written for The Simpsons but left following the fourth season, and produced by James L. Brooks, who was also a producer for The Simpsons. The show had premiered on the ABC network in January 1994 but was canceled despite positive critical reception. The series was switched over to Fox, and put in the timeslot directly after The Simpsons. Brooks pitched a crossover episode as a way to promote The Critic and decided that a film festival would be a good way to introduce Sherman.

Matt Groening, creator of The Simpsons, has heavily criticized the episode, feeling that it was just an advertisement for The Critic, and that people would incorrectly associate the show with him. When he was unsuccessful in getting the program pulled, he had his name removed from the credits and went public with his concerns, openly criticizing Brooks.

The episode was directed by Susie Dietter and was the first episode to be written by Ken Keeler. Jon Lovitz, the star of The Critic, guest stars as Jay Sherman, while Maurice LaMarche (who was also a regular on The Critic) has a few minor roles. The episode received mixed reviews from critics, many of whom felt the crossover was out of place on the show, although Barney's film festival entry was well received.

Plot
In response to Springfield being named the least cultural city in the United States, a town meeting is held to decide a course of action, where Marge proposes that Springfield host a film festival showcasing films made by the townspeople. Marge is made the head of the festival's judging panel, and invites New York film critic Jay Sherman to be a special guest critic (who agrees primarily to escape the wrath of an enraged Rainer Wolfcastle, for slating his latest comedy film). Jay's presence makes Homer feel inadequate, so he convinces Marge to put him on the judging panel.

The film festival commences, and many of the townspeople, including Mr. Burns and Hans Moleman, enter films. Festival attendees are particularly touched by Barney Gumble's artistic introspective film about alcoholism, titled Pukahontas, which Marge and Jay foresee to be the eventual winner. Burns' film, directed by Steven Spielberg's non-union Mexican counterpart "Señor Spielbergo", is A Burns for All Seasons, a big-budget pastiche of famous Hollywood productions intended to glorify him; the film is rejected by the audience. He bribes two of the judges, Krusty the Clown and Mayor Quimby, to vote for it, leading to a deadlock. Left with the tie-breaking vote, Homer enthusiastically votes for Hans' aptly-named Man Getting Hit by Football, but Marge and Jay convince him to reconsider and Pukahontas is named the winner. Barney declares that his victory has inspired him to give up drinking, but immediately forgets his promise when Quimby reveals his prize to be a lifetime supply of Duff Beer.

Sherman prepares to return to New York, and the Simpsons thank him for his help in making the festival a success. Marge suggests that Mr. Burns has learned a lesson that you cannot bribe everyone. Contrary to her statement, he submits A Burns for All Seasons to the Academy Awards; due to his bribing of everyone in Hollywood, he is nominated for an Oscar for Best Actor. At the ceremony, the winner is announced to be George C. Scott, based on his performance in a remake of Man Getting Hit by Football, angering Burns further.

Production

The Critic was a short-lived animated series that revolved around the life of movie critic Jay Sherman. It was created by Al Jean and Mike Reiss, who had previously written for The Simpsons but left after the fourth season, and executive produced by James L. Brooks. Jon Lovitz, who had previously guest starred in several episodes of The Simpsons, starred as Jay Sherman, and it also featured the voices of The Simpsons regulars Nancy Cartwright, Doris Grau, and Russi Taylor. It was first broadcast on ABC in January 1994, and was well received by critics. However, the series did not catch on with viewers and it was put on hiatus after six weeks. It returned in June 1994 and completed airing its initial production run.

For the second season of The Critic, James L. Brooks cut a deal with the Fox network to have the series switch over. The episode was pitched by Brooks, who had wanted a crossover that would help launch The Critic on Fox, and he thought having a film festival in Springfield would be a good way to introduce Sherman. After Brooks pitched the episode, the script was written by Ken Keeler. Although David Mirkin was executive producer for most of the sixth season, the episode was executive produced by Al Jean and Mike Reiss. Jay Sherman's appearance was given a makeover: he was made yellow and given an overbite.

The episode contains a meta-reference to the fact that it is a crossover episode in a conversation Bart has with Sherman:
[Bart is watching television] Announcer: Coming up next, The Flintstones meet The Jetsons.
Bart: Uh oh. I smell another cheap cartoon crossover.
[Homer enters the room with Jay] Homer: Bart Simpson, meet Jay Sherman, the critic.
Jay: Hello.
Bart: Hey man, I really love your show. I think all kids should watch it! [turns away] Ew, I suddenly feel so dirty.

The joke was pitched by Al Jean.

Alongside Jon Lovitz, the episode guest stars Maurice LaMarche, a regular on The Critic, who voices George C. Scott as well as Jay Sherman's belch. Phil Hartman also makes a brief appearance as an actor resembling Charlton Heston portraying Judah Ben-Hur in Mr. Burns' film. Rainier Wolfcastle's line, "on closer inspection, these are loafers", was ad-libbed by Dan Castellaneta who was providing the voice of the character on a temporary track. It was later re-recorded by Wolfcastle's normal voice actor, Harry Shearer.

Cultural references
"The Imperial March" from The Empire Strikes Back is played as Mr. Burns is introduced. Burns says he wants Señor Spielbergo to do for him what Steven Spielberg did for Oskar Schindler, a reference to the 1993 film Schindler's List. The character of Jay Sherman was based on Roger Ebert. The actors who attempt to impersonate Mr. Burns are intended to caricature Anthony Hopkins and William Shatner. 

The song the "Rappin' Rabbis" play in the opening moments of the episode is a parody of "U Can't Touch This" by MC Hammer. The opening of Bart's movie The Eternal Struggle is a reference to The Amazing Criswell's narration in Plan 9 from Outer Space. Barney's movie contains references to Koyaanisqatsi, and the music of the film, which was composed by Philip Glass. Marge says "Did you know there are over 600 critics on TV and Leonard Maltin is the best looking of them all?" Lisa replies "Ewwww!"

Reception

Critical reception
The authors of the book I Can't Believe It's a Bigger and Better Updated Unofficial Simpsons Guide, Warren Martyn and Adrian Wood, wrote, "Jay Sherman perhaps proves here, even more so than in The Critic, just why that show failed. He's too flawed to be likeable." They added, "Barney's film is magnificent, but it's easy to see why Homer wants Hans Moleman to be the winner."

Adam Finley of TV Squad wrote, "the episode, even if I didn't care for it as a whole, does have moments that are still very Simpson-y, and still very funny. Jay's appearance, however, casts a shadow over everything that tends to leave a bad taste in my mouth."

Todd Gilchrist of IGN listed Barney's film as one of the best moments of the sixth season.

The A.V. Club named Hans Moleman's line, "I was saying 'Boo-urns'", and Mr. Burns' line, "Then get me his non-union, Mexican equivalent!", as two quotations from The Simpsons that can be used in everyday situations.

IGN ranked Jon Lovitz as the eighth best guest star in the show's history.

Ratings
In its original broadcast, "A Star Is Burns" finished 57th in the ratings for the week of February 27 to March 5, 1995. The episode was the third highest rated show on the Fox network that week, beaten only by Melrose Place and Beverly Hills, 90210. The Critic, which premiered on Fox just after this episode, finished 64th. On March 12, 2002, the episode was released in the United States on a DVD collection titled The Simpsons Film Festival, along with the season eleven episode "Beyond Blunderdome", the season four episode "Itchy & Scratchy: The Movie", and the season seven episode "22 Short Films About Springfield".

Controversy

Matt Groening, creator of The Simpsons, was critical of the episode when it first released. He felt that the crossover was a thirty-minute advertisement and blamed James L. Brooks, calling it an attempt to get attention for one of his unsuccessful shows. After he was unable to get the episode pulled, he decided to go public with his concerns shortly before the episode aired. He stated that his reasons for doing so were that he hoped Brooks would have a change of heart and pull the episode, and that "articles began to appear in several newspapers around the country saying that [Groening] created 'The Critic.'" Groening had his name removed from the credits, so he does not receive his normal "created by" and "developed by" credits that air at the end of the opening sequence.

In response, Brooks said "I am furious with Matt, he's been going to everybody who wears a suit at Fox and complaining about this. When he voiced his concerns about how to draw The Critic into the Simpsons' universe he was right and we agreed to his changes. Certainly he's allowed his opinion, but airing this publicly in the press is going too far. [...] He is a gifted, adorable, cuddly ingrate. But his behavior right now is rotten."

Al Jean and Mike Reiss, creators of The Critic, had previously worked on The Simpsons and had executive produced the third and fourth seasons. Brooks said, "for years, Al and Mike were two guys who worked their hearts out on this show, staying up until 4 in the morning to get it right. The point is, Matt's name has been on Mike's and Al's scripts and he has taken plenty of credit for a lot of their great work. In fact, he is the direct beneficiary of their work. The Critic is their shot and he should be giving them his support." Reiss stated that he was a "little upset" by Groening's actions and that "this taints everything at the last minute. [...] This episode doesn't say 'Watch The Critic all over it." Jean added "What bothers me about all of this, is that now people may get the impression that this Simpsons episode is less than good. It stands on its own even if The Critic never existed."

Groening was criticized for going public with his complaints. Ray Richmond of the Los Angeles Daily News wrote "Who's right? Well, Groening is probably correct in judging this an integrity issue. It's a fairly tacky bit of promotion, the kind generally beneath The Simpsons. But it's also true that little is accomplished by taking a gripe like this public. Quietly erasing his name from the credits would have been sufficient. [...] I admire the man's standing up for his creative rights. But I question the way he's gone about it."

As a result, Groening was absent from the episode's commentary for The Complete Sixth Season DVD boxset.

Legacy
In the end, The Critic was short-lived, broadcasting ten episodes on Fox before its cancellation. A total of only 23 episodes were produced, and it returned briefly in 2000 with a series of ten internet broadcast webisodes. The series has since developed a cult following thanks to reruns on Comedy Central and its complete series release on DVD.

Jay Sherman has since become an infrequently recurring character on The Simpsons, appearing in speaking roles in "Hurricane Neddy" and "The Ziff Who Came to Dinner."

Idiomatic use of the phrase "say the quiet part loud" to mean to reveal an opinion usually expected to be kept from the public, derived from Krusty's line "I said the quiet part loud and the loud part quiet" after unwittingly admitting to being bribed by Mr Burns into choosing A Burns for All Seasons as the winning film, gained wide currency in the 2010s, chiefly in political discourse.

References

Bibliography

External links

Crossover animation
The Simpsons (season 6) episodes
1995 American television episodes
The Critic
Crossover television
Television episodes written by Ken Keeler
Television episodes about filmmaking

it:Episodi de I Simpson (sesta stagione)#Il Film Festival di Springfield